Gadiel Figueroa Robles is a Puerto Rican soccer player who plays Midfielder for Sevilla FC Puerto Rico in the Puerto Rico Soccer League.  Figueroa also plays for the Puerto Rican national team.

International goals

External links
 Sevilla FC Profile

1986 births
People from Caguas, Puerto Rico
Living people
Puerto Rican footballers
Puerto Rico international footballers
Sevilla FC Puerto Rico players
Association football midfielders